Saudades de Rock (which roughly translates from Portuguese as "Nostalgic Yearnings of Rock") is the fifth album by the American rock band Extreme. Released on August 12, 2008, it is their most recent album as of 2022. It was the band's first album of new material since 1995's Waiting for the Punchline, and also their first release with new drummer Kevin Figueiredo.

Production and marketing
On August 14, 2007, it was reported on Blabbermouth.net that Extreme were writing a new song, entitled "Rock 'n' Roll Man", to perform at the Brad Delp (late Boston singer) tribute concert, which was being held on August 19 in Boston, Massachusetts. In addition, vocalist Gary Cherone and guitarist Nuno Bettencourt had begun writing new material for Extreme's first post-reunion album. On November 26, 2007, while it was reported that Extreme were officially reformed, the band would eventually begin work on their new album for a spring 2008 release as well as a world tour to follow.

On January 15, 2008, Bettencourt posted an update stating that Extreme were "finishing up the recording" of their "new release". He claimed the band "had a great time jamming and creating" and also "ended up with about 24 tunes", which they "dwindled down to the 14 that will be on the record". He also described the songs as "a 'mishmash' of old-school rock and some tasty abstract ditties". On April 29, 2008, Cherone posted an update stating that the album was finished "except for one lead vocal and a few backgrounds" and said that Bettencourt was "working overtime finishing up the mixes". Cherone also stated that the album contained "the best performances of the band... ever".

On June 16, 2008, Blabbermouth.net announced August 1, 2008, as the release date for Saudades de Rock in  Europe and on July 15, 2008, the band's website revealed a release date of August 12, 2008, for the USA.

On July 22, 2008, the song "Comfortably Dumb" premiered on the band's profile at Ultimate Guitar.

The album's lead single, "Star," failed to chart in the U.S. However, the song and accompanying video for "King of the Ladies" reached #4 on the AOL Video Charts in 2010, according to Billboard. Additional videos were shot for the songs "Interface," "Run," and "Ghost," which were released in 2010 on the Extreme DVD Take Us Alive.

Track listing

 Track 14 appears only on the European version released by Frontiers Records.
 Japanese edition includes bonus track "Mr. Bates (Demo 1986)" instead of "Americocaine (Demo 1985)".

Credits
Gary Cherone – lead vocals
Nuno Bettencourt – guitars, keyboards, backing vocals
Pat Badger – bass, backing vocals
Kevin Figueiredo – drums

Charts

References 

Extreme (band) albums
2008 albums
Fontana Records albums